The Methodist Episcopal Church Parsonage is a single-family home located at 332 East Washington Street in Ann Arbor, Michigan.  It was listed on the National Register of Historic Places in 1982.

History
The Methodist Episcopal Church in Ann Arbor was founded in 1927, one of the oldest congregations in the state.  In 1857, The Rev. Seth Reed was appointed to a two-year pastorate at the church.  Known as a strong organizer, Reed had reinvigorated a number of other congregations in the state, and Ann Arbor was no exception.  In his two years, Reed enlarged and modernized the congregation's 1937 church, and had this parsonage built.

The house served as a parsonage until about 1880.  In 1882, English immigrant and shoe merchant William Allaby purchased the house.  Allaby lived there until his death in 1910.  In 1924, auto dealer and repair shop owner Albert M. Graves purchased the house.  Graves died in 1927, but his widow continued to live in the house until her death in 1962.  In 1957 the house was divided into apartments.  The house was rehabilitated into commercial and residential space in 1980.

Description
The former Methodist Episcopal Church Parsonage is a two-story, end-gable, Greek Revival structure with a -story rear wing.  It is covered with clapboard.  The front entrance is surrounded by sidelights and a transom light and capped with a cornice supported by Tuscan pilasters.  The house has scalloped-edge eavesboard trim and by a highly stylized classical porch on the side entrance, indicating the transition from classical Greek Revival style to the more decorative styles of the later nineteenth century.

References

		
National Register of Historic Places in Washtenaw County, Michigan
Greek Revival architecture in Michigan
Religious buildings and structures completed in 1858
Methodist Episcopal Church
Buildings and structures in Ann Arbor, Michigan